Congonhas (Congonhas do Campo until 1948) is a historical Brazilian city located in the state of Minas Gerais. As of 2020, the city had a population of 55,309.

It is a well preserved historic city and retains the characteristics of a baroque city, with its churches, buildings and museums.

Other historical cities in Minas Gerais are Ouro Preto, São João del-Rei, Diamantina, Mariana, Tiradentes and Sabará.

Sanctuary of Bom Jesus de Matosinhos
In the ramped forecourt of the basilica are twelve soapstone sculptures depicting Twelve Prophets, crafted by Aleijadinho, one of the best artists in the baroque style in the world. The twelve sculptures of old testament prophets around the terrace are considered one of his finest works. Around the forecourt are six chapels with painted wooden scenes depicting the Stations of the Cross. In 1985 the Sanctuary was named a World Heritage Site by UNESCO for its exemplary Baroque architecture and art.

See also
 List of municipalities in Minas Gerais
 Twelve Prophets of Aleijadinho

References

External links

World Heritage profile
Sanctuary of Bom Jesus do Congonhas UNESCO property on google arts and culture

Municipalities in Minas Gerais
World Heritage Sites in Brazil